The seventeenth Balkan Basketball Championship was held in 1975 in Bucharest, Romania. Four national teams from Balkan area took part in the competition. The championship was won by Yugoslavia .

Results 

19.09 Greece-Romania 78-83(32-38)

19.09 Yugoslavia-Bulgaria 101-76(52-36)

20.09 Greece-Yugoslavia 68-84(29-34)

20.09 Romania-Bulgaria 81-70(41-36)

21.09 Greece-Bulgaria 61-63(29-25)

21.09 Yugoslavia-Romania 99-88(47-47)

Final rankings

External links
Τι έγινε στις 20 προηγούμενες βαλκανιάδες - Αθλητική Ηχώ 14/9/1979, σελ.5
ALBANIAN BASKET IN INTERNATIONAL FIELD
Delo newspaper
Slobodna Dalmacija newspaper
Milliyet newspaper
Cumhuriyet newspaper
Romanian newspaper
Greek games in 1975

Sources
 Durupınar, Mehmet. Türk Basketbolunun 100 yıllık tarihi, (2009). Efes Pazarlama ve Dağıtım Ticaret A.Ş. 
 Milivoje Karalejić, Saša Jakovljević, Žarko Kandić, Vladimir Stanković, Milan Tasić, Ivica Mihajlović.  Košarkaška enciklopedija 1946-2000 : muške reprezentacije (2001) 
 100 χρόνια Μπάσκετ 1891-1991, Περιοδικό Τρίποντο, 1991

Basketball competitions in Europe between national teams
International basketball competitions hosted by Albania
International basketball competitions hosted by Bulgaria
International basketball competitions hosted by Greece
International basketball competitions hosted by Romania
International basketball competitions hosted by Turkey
International basketball competitions hosted by Yugoslavia
Sport in the Balkans